Lucius Calpurnius Piso Caesoninus (48 BC – AD 32) was a prominent Roman senator of the early Empire. His tenure as pontifex led him sometimes to be called Lucius Calpurnius Piso Pontifex, to differentiate him from his contemporary, Lucius Calpurnius Piso the Augur, consul in 1 BC. He was a confidant of the emperors Augustus and Tiberius.

Biography
He was the son of Lucius Calpurnius Piso Caesoninus, consul in 58 BC, and half-brother of Calpurnia, the third and last wife of Julius Caesar.

Piso was consul in 15 BC, and shortly thereafter engaged in Mediolanum as proconsul. Cassius Dio refers to him as governor of Pamphylia in the years 13 to 11 BC; his province probably included Galatia. In 11 BC, he was sent to Thrace as legatus pro praetore in order to put down a revolt. For his successes there, the senate honoured him with the ornamenta triumphalia.

Piso may have also been proconsul of Asia and legate of Syria, but this is disputed. He was praefectus urbi from AD 13 to 32, and a trusted adviser to both Augustus and Tiberius. He was a member of the pontifical college and of the Arval Brethren. He died in 32, and was honoured with a state funeral.

Piso's achievements and independence were highly regarded. Horace dedicated his Ars Poëtica to him (cf. Carmen 2.12), and several epigrams by Antipater of Thessalonica are dedicated to Piso.

Name
Piso's full nomenclature is somewhat uncertain. Tacitus simply refers to him as Lucius Piso, while the Fasti Albenses call him Lucius Calpurnius Piso. He is sometimes called Lucius Calpurnius Piso Pontifex, to distinguish him from his contemporary, Lucius Calpurnius Piso Augur, although both Pontifex and Augur are simply nicknames, rather than true cognomina. Drumann assigned Piso the agnomen Caesoninus, which had been borne by his ancestors for four generations; but in later editions he is assigned the name Frugi instead. There are two grounds for the latter identification. First, Cassius Dio assigns him the surname Fourtios, which is supposed to be a corruption of Frugi. Secondly, Theodor Mommsen identified his sons, to whom the Ars Poëtica is addressed, with Lucius Calpurnius Piso and Marcus Licinius Crassus Frugi, consuls in AD 27.

However, Klebs doubted this interpretation of Fourtios, and it is not at all certain that the consuls of AD 27 were the sons of Lucius Calpurnius Piso Pontifex. They might instead have been the sons of Gnaeus Calpurnius Piso, consul in 7 BC. In this instance, Marcus Licinius Crassus Frugi would be identified with the Gnaeus Calpurnius Piso whom the senate compelled to change his praenomen. As a result, the question of whether Piso the pontifex was surnamed Caesoninus or Frugi is unresolved.

See also
 Bierzo Edict
 Calpurnia gens
 Villa of the Papyri
 List of Roman consuls

References

Sources
 Seneca, Epistulae 83.14

48 BC births
32 deaths
1st-century BC Roman consuls
1st-century Romans
Ancient Roman generals
Caesoninus, Lucius
Generals of Augustus
Roman governors of Galatia
Roman governors of Thracia
Senators of the Roman Empire
Urban prefects of Rome